An andén is a pre-Columbian agricultural terrace.

Anden or Andén may also refer to:

People
Eva Andén (1886–1970), a Swedish lawyer
Mathew Anden (1942–1985), German actor
Mini Andén (b. 1978), Swedish model, actress
Gwyneth Van Anden Walker (b. 1947), American music educator and composer
Anders Matthesen (b. 1975), Danish stand-up comedian
Anden Stavropoulos, character in the 2013 novel Prodigy

Other uses
Anda, Norway, an island in the Norwegian Sea
Anden language, a language of West Papua, Indonesia